Fennville High School is a four-year comprehensive public high school serving students in grades nine through twelve from Fennville, Michigan, United States, as part of the Fennville Public Schools.

Notable alumni
J. Edward Hutchinson - US Congressman from Fourth Congressional District of Michigan 1963-1977

See also
List of high schools in Michigan

References

Public high schools in Michigan
Schools in Allegan County, Michigan